Baganbazar Union is a Union of Bhujpur Thana of Chittagong District.

Geography
Area: 47,251 acres (191.22 km2)।

Location
 North: Tripura (in India)
 East: Manikchhari Upazila
 South: Dantmara Union
 West: Sitakunda Mountain Range and Mirsharai Upazila

Education
 Baganbazar High School
 Bagan Bazar Farukia Dakhil Madrasha 
 Chikonchara High School
 Gazaria Zebunnesa Para High School
 Gazaria government primary school 
 Andermanik government primary School
 Amtoli government primary school
 Koraliatakia government primary school
 Panua government primary school
 Noydolong government primary school
 Rasulpur government primary school
 Borobil government primary school
 Kachuakhonda government primary school
 Lalmai government primary school
Jungle Dantmara govt. Primary school, South Gazaria

Marketplaces and bazaars
 নতুন বাজার
 Baganbazar
 Gaderbazar
 Chikonchara
 Andermanik
 Amtoli
 Koraliatakia
 Gazaria
 Panua
 Udoypathor
 Borobil
 Lalmy

References

Unions of Bhujpur Thana